Alekšince is a village and a municipality in the Nitra District in western Slovakia, in the Nitra Region.

History
According to archeological evidence, the area was inhabited since the paleolithic. The investigations on Maďaroš hill also revealed a settlement from the Bronze Age. Several items from the Iron Age and the Roman imperial period were discovered as well.

In historical records, the village was first mentioned in 1156 when Martirius, the archbishop of Esztergom, donated church lands in 70 villages to the Esztergom canonry in order to improve the economic welfare of the canons. One the villages of the archdeaconry was "villa Alexu"- known today as Alekšince. A deed of donation from 1275 by the king Ladislaus IV of Hungary lists the first owner: knight Deuse, who died during a Tatar invasion in 1241–1242. In this deed, the village appears under the name of Elekchy.

Coat of arms
Since the 18th century, the official seal has been in use. The seal depicts a female figure with an aureole, Saint Anne, the patron saint of the village.

On June 18, 1996, the local council authorized the coat of arms and an official village seal and flag. The coat of arms is a heraldic stylization of Saint Anne, who is usually depicted as a woman carrying a child and a book (Saint Anne was the mother of Virgin Mary). The book in the coat of arms represents the Old Testament, that promises the arrival of the Messiah, which Saint Anne uses to teach her daughter. The lily symbolizes the virginity of Mary. In Christian tradition, the combination of the two symbols is used exclusively for Saint Anne. The colour combination is determined by green as the main colour associated with Saint Anne. The book is yellow (golden) and the lily is white (gray).

Alekšince's coat of arms therefore depicts a green field with silver lily over a closed golden book.

Geography

Total area: 1507 ha
Agricultural land: 1322.8 ha
Arable land: 1255 ha
Vineyards: 68.8 ha
Non-agricultural land: 183,2 ha
Forest land: 21 ha
Built-up area: 134.2 ha

Population
Alekšince has a total population of 1673.

There are:
809 men
864 women

The age distribution is the following:
Pre-working age (0-14): 248
Working-age men (15-59): 573
Working-age (15-54):501
Post-working-age men (60+):127
Post-working-age women (55+):224

The village is approximately 98% Slovak. The nationalities are as follows:
Slovak: 1641
Hungarian: 7
Romani: 2
Rusyns: 1
Czech: 4
Other: 3
Not specified: 15

Facilities
The village has a public library, a gym, and a football pitch. There is also an elementary school and a kindergarten.

Genealogical resources

The records for genealogical research are available at the state archive "Statny Archiv in Nitra, Slovakia"

 Roman Catholic church records (births/marriages/deaths): 1789-1898
 Lutheran church records (births/marriages/deaths): 1783-1919
 Census records 1869 of Aleksince are available at the state archive.

See also
 List of municipalities and towns in Slovakia

References

External links
 
 
https://web.archive.org/web/20070513023228/http://www.statistics.sk/mosmis/eng/run.html
Surnames of living people in Aleksince

Villages and municipalities in Nitra District